Tlyustenkhabl is an urban locality (an urban-type settlement) in Teuchezhsky District of the Republic of Adygea, Russia, located on the left bank of the Kuban River opposite of Krasnodar in Krasnodar Krai, on the shores of Krasnodar Reservoir,  northwest of Maykop, the capital of the republic. As of the 2010 Census, its population was 5,403.

Administrative and municipal status
Within the framework of administrative divisions, the urban-type settlement of Tlyustenkhabl is subordinated to Teuchezhsky District. As a municipal division, Tlyustenkhabl, together with one rural locality (the aul of Tugurgoy), is incorporated within Teuchezhsky Municipal District as Tlyustenkhablskoye Urban Settlement.

Sultan Khan-Giray
In 1990s a memorial to Circassian ethnographer and writer Sultan Khan-Giray who was born and died there was erected in Tlyustenkhabl.

References

Notes

Sources

Urban-type settlements in Adygea
